Kazimierz Michał Ujazdowski (born 28 July 1964 in Kielce) is a Polish politician and lawyer, associate professor of law at the University of Lodz. Minister of Culture and National Heritage in the governments of Jerzy Buzek (2000–2001), Kazimierz Marcinkiewicz (2005–2006) and Jarosław Kaczyński (2006–2007), deputy speaker of the Sejm of the fourth term. Member of the Sejm of the 1st (1991–1993) and of the 3rd, 4th, 5th, 6th and 7th term (1997–2014), Member of the European Parliament of the 8th term (2014–2019), senator of the 10th term (from 2019).

Author of press publications, as well as the author, co-author and editor of books devoted mainly to cultural and historical policy, political and constitutional issues as well as the history of Polish conservatism and conservative thought. He has published in Rzeczpospolita, Gazeta Wyborcza, Dziennik, Wprost, Gazeta Polska, Gość Niedzielny, Nowe Państwo and Życie. He was a member of the editorial board of Polityka Polska (1990-1991). Ujazdowski is also the founder and editor of the Kwartalnik Konserwatywny. Kazimierz Ujazdowski is also the founder and director of the Europejskie Centrum Badań Ustrojowych (European Center for Constitutional Research) at University of Łódź. In June 2021, Ujazdowski founded, together with, inter alia, Marek Biernacki, MP, think tank Centrum Dobrego Państwa.

On 13 October 2022, Ujazdowski launched the Centre for Poland as a political party, which will be part of the Polish Coalition.

Kazimierz Michał Ujazdowski is the grandson of Kazimierz Cyprian Ujazdowski, an attorney from the interwar period, a defense attorney in political trials (including the Brest trials). Father - Kazimierz Mieczysław Ujazdowski - was a Member of Parliament, defended in political trials, among others during the martial law period.

See also
Members of Polish Sejm 2005-2007
Przymierze Prawicy
Koalicja Konserwatywna

References

1964 births
Living people
Politicians from Kielce
Culture ministers of Poland
Law and Justice politicians
Deputy Marshals of the Sejm of the Third Polish Republic
Members of the Polish Sejm 1991–1993
Members of the Polish Sejm 1997–2001
Members of the Polish Sejm 2001–2005
Members of the Polish Sejm 2005–2007
MEPs for Poland 2014–2019
Members of the Polish Sejm 2007–2011
Members of the Senate of Poland 2019–2023